A papur bro (local paper; plural papurau bro) is a Welsh-language local community newsletter, produced by volunteers and generally published monthly. The first such publication was Y Dinesydd, established in Cardiff in April 1973. There are currently 58 papurau bro, produced throughout Wales. With changing times and appetites, more modern, online versions of papurau bro have started to appear such as: Pobl Caerdydd (Cardiff), Pobl Aberystwyth, Pobl y Fro (Vale of Glamorgan) and Pobl Dinefwr.

During 2015-2016, Papurau bro had a combined distribution of 66,808 copies each month.

See also
List of Papurau Bro

References

Newspapers published in Wales
Welsh-language newspapers